Salad is any of a wide variety of dishes including: green salads; vegetable salads; long beans; salads of pasta, legumes, or grains; mixed salads incorporating meat, poultry, or seafood; and fruit salads. They often include vegetables and fruits.

Varieties of salad

Unsorted

 Bionico
 Blunkett salad
 Broccoli slaw
 Buljol
 Candle salad
 Carrot salad
 Dessert salad
 Esgarrat
 Esqueixada
 Frogeye salad
 Goma-ae
 Hummus salad
 Israeli eggplant salad
 Kısır
 Koi
 Kuluban
 Kung chae nampla
 Malfouf salad
 Maple slaw
 Masmouta salad
 Matbukha
 Mechouia salad
 Mizeria
 Nam khao
 Nam tok
 Nan gyi thohk
 Nộm
 Nopalito
 Olive salad
 Pantesca salad
 Rubiyan salad
 Sabzi khordan
 Salade cauchoise
 Salată de boeuf
 Salmagundi
 Seafoam salad
 Shalgam
 Shʿifurah
 Sicilian orange salad
 Snow white salad
 Sōmen salad
 Spinach salad
 Strawberry Delight – a dessert salad
 Sweet potato salad
 Taktouka
 Ulam
 Urnebes
 Ummak huriyya
 Wheat salad
 Yum sen lon

Salad dressings

The following are examples of common salad dressings:

 Blue cheese dressing
 Caesar dressing
 Extra virgin olive oil
 French dressing
 Green goddess dressing
 Honey Dijon
 Italian dressing
 Louis dressing
 Ranch dressing
 Rice vinegar
 Russian dressing
 Salad cream
 Tahini
 Thousand Island dressing
 Vinaigrette
 Sesame dressing
 Wafu dressing

See also

 Anju
 Cuisine
 Eggplant salads and appetizers
 Hors d'œuvre
 List of Arab salads
 List of vegetable dishes
 Meze
 Salad bar
 Thai salads
 Zakuski

References

External links

Salad Recipes from Allrecipes

 
Lists of foods by type